Pulaski County High School (PCHS) is a public high school located in Pulaski County, Kentucky, United States. It is operated by Pulaski County Schools. It serves the communities of Eubank, Shopville, Woodstock, and parts of the City of Somerset, Kentucky. Students in the Science Hill area, which has its own school district that operates a single K-8 school, attend Somerset High School, per the regulation changes made in 2014.

Students 
PCHS serves grades nine through twelve. At last count, about 1,161 students were enrolled.

Sports 
Sports at PCHS include baseball, softball, football, basketball, track, golf, soccer, volleyball, archery, cheerleading, dance, tennis and swim teams. The school mascot is a pirate.

In 2014 The Maroons won the first football state title in Pulaski County History among all 3 schools. 

Former NBA player Reggie Hanson played for the Maroons in high school before attending the University of Kentucky.

Former MLB player Josh Anderson played for the Maroons in High school before attending Eastern Kentucky University.

Music
Pulaski County High School offers a variety of performing ensembles and competitive groups.

Band Department
Marching Band
Concert Band
Pep Band
Jazz Band
Winter Drumline
Winter Guard
Jr. Winter Guard

Choral Department
Concert Choir
Chamber Choir
Advanced Women's Choir
Drama

Clubs 
Club Days are held the first Friday of every month. Some of the club offerings include FBLA, FCA, FEA, FFA, Environmental, DECA, Book Club, Anime Club, History Club, WWE Club and JROTC.

References

External links 
Pulaski County High School website

Public high schools in Kentucky
Schools in Pulaski County, Kentucky
Somerset, Kentucky